The Panevėžys Evangelical Lutheran Church is an Evangelical Lutheran church in Panevėžys, Lithuania. The current church was built in 1845–1850, however the Panevėžys Evangelical Lutheran Parish was founded in 1790–1795.

Gallery

References

Lutheran churches in Panevėžys
Churches completed in 1850
19th-century Lutheran church buildings in Lithuania
1850 establishments in the Russian Empire